Palatine Bridge Freight House is a historic freight depot located at Palatine Bridge in Montgomery County, New York. It is a rectangular limestone building constructed in the mid-1850s.  It measures 300 feet long and is a fine example of a mid 19th century storage house.  It has a low slope gable roof with overhanging eaves.

It was added to the National Register of Historic Places in 1973.

References

Infrastructure completed in 1855
Buildings and structures in Montgomery County, New York
National Register of Historic Places in Montgomery County, New York
Railway freight houses on the National Register of Historic Places in New York (state)